The Downtown New London Historic District, also known as the Waterfront Historic District, refers to  with 223 contributing buildings along the waterfront of New London, Connecticut. The district was expanded in 1988, adding  and 33 buildings.

History and description

Bank Street
Bank Street is so named because it sits atop the bank of the Thames River. It is one of New London's oldest sections and was once dominated by fishing wharves and tall ships. Benedict Arnold led British forces through New London in 1781, burning much of the city to the ground during the American Revolutionary War. The waterfront was subsequently rebuilt and the roadway was raised to accommodate additional development and larger ships.

The bank itself is now home to a number of restaurants, cafes, and boutiques and is dotted with a handful of 18th-century structures, including:

the Shaw Mansion, built in 1753, which served as Connecticut Navy Headquarters during the American Revolution
Bukeley House, built in 1796; the original owner of this house served with John Paul Jones

Bank Street also includes 19th-century buildings, including:

New London Customhouse, built in 1833, the oldest such building continuously operated in the United States
the Brown House at 258 Bank Street at the intersection of Tilley Street, built in 1833 in the Federal/Greek Revival style for Benjamin Brown, using the same materials as the Custom House including granite quarried from the ledge behind the house
the site of the events surrounding the slave ship La Amistad

State Street
State Street runs east-west through the District from Huntington Street to Water Street and is lined with 19th-century buildings. Notable exceptions are the 1787 New London County Courthouse at the head of State Street, which was separately designated to the NRHP and is not part of the District, and the 1740 Timothy Green printing studio off State and Green Streets.  At one time the 1774 Nathan Hale School House was located on State Street, but it has been moved to Atlantic Street north of the Soldiers and Sailors Monument.

State Street is also the location of a number of notable buildings, such as:

Leopold Eidlitz's First Church of Christ (Congregational), a Gothic Revival structure built in 1850, located at the corner of State and Union Streets
the 1856 First Baptist Church at 268 State Street, designed in the Italianate style by William T. Hallett
Eidlitz's Romanesque Revival Harris Place (1885) at 159 State Street, a mixed-use building which housed offices, eight luxury apartments, and the Hislop, Porteus & Mitchell department store
Lyric Hall (1898) at 243 State Street, designed by James Sweeney, which had a small theater used for lectures and music and dance recitals
Ewing & Chappell's 1905 Thames Club at 290 State Street
James Sweeney's Beaux-Arts New London City Hall (1912), also known as the Municipal Building, at 181 State Street
The 1930 Greek Revival bank building at 250 State Street
 Lena Building (originally J.N. Harris Building), 1884-1885
 The New London Public Library is also on State Street at the corner of Huntington Street, built in 1889-92 and designed by Shepley, Rutan & Coolidge in the Richardsonian Romanesque style.

Green Street is also part of the downtown historic area, just off State. It was laid out officially in 1787, and many of the buildings in this neighborhood date from 1760-1792 and survived the torch of Benedict Arnold. Eugene O'Neill's favorite watering spot was Dutch's Tavern, better known as The Dutch and housed in a 1760 building. The home at 79 Green dates to around 1801 and is known as The Richard Douglass House; Douglass was a veteran of the American Revolution, and the house is still a private residence.

Also in the immediate area is the Starr Street District, a group of row houses built in the first two decades of the 1800s. The New London Railroad Station is also within the physical confines of the district, but not part of it; it is separately listed on the NRHP like the Courthouse, Customhouse, and Public Library.

Gallery

See also
National Register of Historic Places listings in New London County, Connecticut

References
Notes

External links

Original nomination:  With 
Boundary increase:  With 

Buildings and structures in New London, Connecticut
Historic districts in New London County, Connecticut
Tourist attractions in New London, Connecticut
National Register of Historic Places in New London County, Connecticut
Historic districts on the National Register of Historic Places in Connecticut